The 1972–73 WCHL season was the seventh season of the Western Canada Hockey League. Twelve teams completed a 68-game season, with the Medicine Hat Tigers winning the President's Cup.

Regular season

Final standings

Scoring leaders
Note: GP = Games played; G = Goals; A = Assists; Pts = Points; PIM = Penalties in minutes

1973 WCHL Playoffs

Quarterfinals
Saskatoon defeated Brandon 4 games to 2
Flin Flon defeated Regina 4 games to 0
Edmonton defeated New Westminster 4 games to 1
Medicine Hat defeated Calgary 4 games to 2

Semifinals
Saskatoon defeated Flin Flon 4 games to 1
Medicine Hat defeated Edmonton 4 games to 2

Finals
Medicine Hat defeated Saskatoon 3 games to 0 with 2 ties

All-Star game

The 1972–73 WCHL All-Star Game was held in Medicine Hat, Alberta, with the West Division All-Stars defeating the East Division All-Stars 6–1 before a crowd of 5,336.

Awards

All-Star Team
Goaltender: John Davidson, Calgary Centennials
Defenseman: George Pesut, Saskatoon Blades
Defenseman: Greg Joly, Regina Pats
Centerman: Tom Lysiak, Medicine Hat Tigers
Left Winger: Darcy Rota, Edmonton Oil Kings
Right Winger: Lanny McDonald, Medicine Hat Tigers

See also
1972 in sports
1973 in sports

References
whl.ca
 2005–06 WHL Guide

Western Hockey League seasons
WCHL